Idi (Malayalam ഇടി ഇറച്ചി) meat is the method of killing animals for consumption in Kerala, India. It involves hitting an animal in its forehead with a thick piece of wood or metal block to kill it instantly. Hitting in the head is believed to cut off the brain first so the animal suffers the least pain. This is not a ritual killing.  It is non-Halal meat.

This method is mostly followed by Syrian Christians of Kerala.  Most of Central and Southern Kerala follows this method.

In general, water buffalo and cattle are killed this way. Animals are first tied by their legs and laid down, then their eyes are covered.

Religion-based diets
Traditional meat processing
Saint Thomas Christians
Kerala society